Zirl Augustus Palmer (1920–1982) was an African-American businessman and activist in Lexington, Kentucky. He opened Palmer's Pharmacy in 1952 in an old building at Fifth and Race Street. He was involved in the city's desegregation and first Black board member of the University of Kentucky Board of Trustees. He and his family were the target of a Ku Klux Klan bombing in 1968.

At the time of Palmer's move to Lexington, the city had an established group of Black professionals, among them were nine medical doctors, four dentists, and no pharmacists.

Due to segregation, soda fountains at the existing pharmacies were off limits to Blacks. Although Palmer first had difficulty in locating an ice cream company willing to do business, Dixie Ice Cream Co. agreed, and his soda fountain grew in popularity.

In 1961, Palmer constructed the mid-century modern building at 400 East Fifth at Chestnut to house his pharmacy, with two doctors, and a lawyer, opening Palmer's Pharmacy, Luncheonette, and Doctor's Office in 1961. The opening was reported in Jet Magazine in December 1961. It was a franchise of Rexall, the company's first Black owned store. He was actively engaged in mentoring neighborhood youth, employing them and referring them to other businesses.

Born in Bluefield, West Virginia, he was educated at Bluefield State College and Howard University, both among Historically Black Colleges and Universities. Since Blacks were barred from the West Virginia professional schools, Palmer found an alternative at Xavier University of Louisiana College of Pharmacy in New Orleans. He sought the financial assistance from his home state, getting train fare and partial tuition paid.

The son of James and Lola Allen Palmer, he was married to Marian Elspy Sidney of Cartersville, Georgia. Both Palmer and his wife were veterans of World War II.

His civic involvement included the National Association for the Advancement of Colored People, the Chamber of Commerce, and Planned Parenthood. At his church, Main Street Baptist, he organized a health care program. Palmer was one of the first members of the Kentucky Commission on Human Rights which is charged with enforcement authority. An organizer of Community Action, he was the first Black member of the Optimist Club and Big Brothers.

He opened a second store in 1966 on Georgetown Street, which was the site of the September 4, 1968, KKK bombing. The store was destroyed and damaged three others in the West End Plaza. Eight people were injured. Palmer, his wife, and four-year-old daughter, Andrea, were hospitalized after being trapped under the rubble for hours.  In 1970, Klansman Phillip J. Campbell of New Albany, Ind. was convicted of this crime after a 90-minute deliberation by an all-white all-male jury and sentenced to 21 years in prison. Following the bombing, he is quoted as saying that to protect his family, he retired and sold his businesses. 

He continued his involvement in the community, including the UK Board of Trustees (1972–1979) to which he was appointed by Governor Wendell Ford. His Fifth and Race building is now the property of city government, which once considered razing the building. However, activists and historic preservationists have fought to allocate funds to preserve the building. An effort is underway to have the building on the National Register of Historic Places.

Dr. Palmer and his wife are both buried in Camp Nelson National Cemetery, Nicholasville, KY, Section H Site 513. 

In October 2022, Palmer was honored by being included in a mural, Standing Tall and Proud, on the Tazewell County Courthouse in Tazewell VA. Artist Ellen Elmes depicts eleven African Americans with ties to this Appalachian region. Among them are a representative coal miner and Lethia Cousins Fleming, a suffragist and teacher. The public art was inspired by a Nov. 2020 advisory referendum which approved not relocating a Confederate statute by a 7-1 margin.  

In February 2023, an agreement with the city of Lexington, the United Way of the Bluegrass agreed to take over the property. The organization will turn it into a neighborhood resource center.

References

1920 births
1982 deaths
African-American businesspeople
NAACP activists
People from Bluefield, West Virginia
Bluefield State College alumni
Howard University alumni
American pharmacists
Xavier University of Louisiana alumni
African Americans in World War II
People associated with Planned Parenthood
 
People from Lexington, Kentucky
Civil Rights Movement portal
Racially motivated violence against African Americans